Shahni Kotli is a village in the district of Gujrat, Pakistan. The most of the people in shahni kotli is Shia Muslims. There are two mosque and two Imambrigah's in village.

Shahni Kotli people are well qualified and they have leadership quality. 

Syed Abu ul Hassan shah is Ex chairman of UC (Union Consul) Thatta Musa belongs to  shahni Kotli.

References

Villages in Gujrat District